

Qualified teams

Bracket

Quarter-finals

Japan vs Egypt

Mexico vs Senegal

Brazil vs Honduras

Great Britain vs South Korea

Semi-finals

Mexico vs Japan

South Korea vs Brazil

Bronze medal match

South Korea vs Japan

Gold medal match

Brazil vs Mexico

References

Knockout stage
knockout stage
Summer Olympics men's knockout stage
Summer Olympics men's knockout stage
Summer Olympics men's knockout stage
knockout stage
Summer Olympics men's knockout stage
Summer Olympics men's knockout stage
Summer Olympics men's knockout stage
Summer Olympics men's knockout stage
knock